Work on translation of the Bible into the Lao language was begun by Swiss Brethren missionaries in 1902, producing three Gospels in 1908, then a translation of the full Bible in 1932. The US Bible Society has recently published a modern translation of the Bible into Lao.

References

Lao